Reni is a small city in Izmail Raion, Odesa Oblast (province) of south Ukraine. It hosts the administration of Reni urban hromada, one of the hromadas of Ukraine. Reni is located in the Bessarabian historic district of Budjak and on the left bank of the Danube. The settlement was founded around 1548, acquiring city status in 1821. Population: 

The surrounding Reni Raion includes some 38,000 people (including those in the town), 49% of them ethnic Moldovans, 18% Ukrainians, 15% Russians, 8.5% Bulgarians and 8% Gagauz.

There are six schools, one filial branch of the Oles Honchar Dnipro National University, and three Ukrainian Orthodox church buildings. It is also home to the Light of the World Church.

Gallery

Personalities
 Maksym Braharu, Ukrainian footballer
 Alexander Deutsch, Soviet astronomer
 Pavel Ciobanu, Moldovan soccer player

References

External links
 

Cities in Odesa Oblast
Populated places on the Danube
Port cities and towns in Ukraine
Port cities of the Black Sea
Cities of district significance in Ukraine
1548 establishments in the Ottoman Empire
Izmailsky Uyezd
Ismail County
Cities in Izmail Raion
 
Reni Hromada